Aspen is a common name for certain tree species; some, but not all, are classified by botanists in the section Populus, of the Populus genus.

Species
These species are called aspens:

Populus adenopoda – Chinese aspen (China, south of P. tremula)
Populus davidiana – Korean aspen (Eastern Asia)
Populus grandidentata – Bigtooth aspen (eastern North America, south of P. tremuloides)
Populus sieboldii – Japanese aspen (Japan)
Populus tremula – Eurasian aspen (northern Europe and Asia)
Populus tremuloides – Quaking aspen or trembling aspen (northern and western North America)

Habitat and longevity

Aspen trees are all native to cold regions with cool summers, in the north of the northern hemisphere, extending south at high-altitude areas such as mountains or high plains. In North America, the aspen is referred to as quaking aspen or trembling aspen because the leaves "quake" or tremble in the wind. This is due to their flattened petioles which reduce aerodynamic drag on the trunk and branches.

Aspens typically grow in environments that are otherwise dominated by coniferous tree species, and which are often lacking other large deciduous tree species. Aspens have evolved several adaptations that aid their survival in such environments. One is the flattened leaf petiole, which reduces aerodynamic drag during high winds and decreases the likelihood of trunk or branch damage. Dropping leaves in the winter (like most but not all other deciduous plants) also helps to prevent damage from heavy winter snow. Additionally, the bark is photosynthetic, meaning that growth is still possible after the leaves have been dropped. The bark also contains lenticels that serve as pores for gas exchange (similar to the stomata on leaves).

Aspens are also aided by the rhizomatic nature of their root systems. Each individual tree can live for 40–150 years above ground, but the root system of the colony is long-lived. In some cases, this is for thousands of years, sending up new trunks as the older trunks die off above ground. For this reason, it is considered to be an indicator of ancient woodlands. One such colony in Utah, given the nickname of "Pando", has been estimated to be as old as 80,000 years, if validated, this would be making it possibly the oldest living colony of aspens. They are able to survive forest fires, because the roots are below the heat of the fire, and new sprouts appear after the fire burns out. The high stem turnover rate combined with the clonal growth leads to proliferation in aspen colonies. The high stem turnover regime supports a diverse herbaceous understory.

Aspen seedlings do not thrive in the shade, and it is difficult for seedlings to establish in an already mature aspen stand. Fire indirectly benefits aspen trees, since it allows the saplings to flourish in open sunlight in the burned landscape, devoid of other competing tree species. Aspens have increased in popularity as a forestry cultivation species, mostly because of their fast growth rate and ability to regenerate from sprouts. This lowers the cost of reforestation after harvesting since no planting or sowing is required.

Recently, aspen populations have been declining in some areas ("Sudden Aspen Death"). This has been attributed to several different factors, such as climate change, which exacerbates drought and modifies precipitation patterns. Recruitment failure from herbivory or grazing prevents new trees from coming up after old trees die. Additionally, successional replacement by conifers due to fire suppression alters forest diversity and creates conditions where aspen may be at less of an advantage.

In contrast with many trees, aspen bark is base-rich, meaning aspens are important hosts for bryophytes and act as food plants for the larvae of butterfly (Lepidoptera) species—see List of Lepidoptera that feed on poplars.

Young aspen bark is an important seasonal forage for the European hare and other animals in early spring. Aspen is also a preferred food of the European beaver. Elk, deer, and moose not only eat the leaves but also strip the bark with their front teeth.

Image gallery

Uses
Aspen wood is white and soft, but fairly strong, and has low flammability. It has a number of uses, notably for making matches and paper where its low flammability makes it safer to use than most other woods. Shredded aspen wood is used for packing and stuffing, sometimes called excelsior (wood wool). Aspen flakes are the most common species of wood used to make oriented strand boards. It is also a popular animal bedding, since it lacks the phenols associated with pine and juniper, which are thought to cause respiratory system ailments in some animals. Heat-treated aspen is a popular material for the interiors of saunas. While standing trees sometimes tend to rot from the heart outward, the dry timber weathers very well, becoming silvery-grey and resistant to rotting and warping, and has traditionally been used for rural construction in the northwestern regions of Russia (especially for roofing, in the form of thin slats).

References

Further reading
 Fox, Mark, Linda E. Tackaberry, Pascal Drouin, Yves Bergeron, Robert L. Bradley, Hughes B. Massicotte, and Han Chen (2013). "Microbial community structure of soils under four productivity classes of aspen forests in Northern British Columbia". Ecoscience 20(3):264–275. .

External links

 Aspen Information Resource, U.K.
 Quaking Aspen Forests of the Colorado Plateau
 Bioimages: Populus grandidentata bigtooth aspen
 Aspen Research Bibliography
 Aspen Photo Gallery
 Aspen Compounds, Medicinal Benefits and Uses
 Loyola Medicine: Aspen Dosage, Interaction, Warnings and Side Effects
 Steens Aspen  Video produced by Oregon Field Guide

Medicinal plants
Negligibly senescent organisms
Plant common names
Populus